A Ballad for Çanakkale (Çanakkale türküsü) is a Turkish folk song about the Battle of Gallipoli which occurred during World War I on the Gallipoli Peninsula.

It was arranged by Muzaffer Sarısözen, with the lyrics of a local bard, İhsan Ozanoğlu, of Kastamonu.

Lyrics

References 

Turkish music
Songs about Turkey
Works about the Gallipoli campaign
Year of song missing
Songwriter unknown